Henry of Lusignan or Henri de Lusignan (died 7 July 1426), Titular Prince of Galilee, a military leader in Egypt, killed in action at Khirokitia or Chirokhitia.

He was son of James I of Cyprus and his first wife Helvis of Brunswick-Grubenhagen. Henry married ca 1406 his cousin Eleonore de Lusignan (d. ca 1414), granddaughter of Jean de Lusignan and second wife Alice d'Ibelin, without issue, and had three bastard children, the male line of which became extinct in 1660:

 Philippe de Lusignan (d. ca 1466), Titular Prince of Galilee, married to Eschive de Nores (d. after 1468), mistress of King James II, the parents of:
 Henri=Herion de Lusignan, Signore di Chiti, married to Helene Chappes, Dame de Psimiloffo et Tripi, the parents of:
 Philippe de Lusignan (died 1546), Seigneur de Simun et Psimiloffo, married ca 1485 Isabelle Fabrice, the parents of:
 Phoebus de Lusignan (d. after 1546), married firstly ... de Verny, married secondly 1521 Isabelle de Zerban, Dame de Menasy, and had:
 Agnes de Lusignan (d. after 1573), married Gaspard Palol
 Jason de Lusignan (1497 – ca 1570), married 1515/1520 Lucie Flatre, the parents of:
 Pierre-Antoine de Lusignan (d. after 1571), married to Marie Goneme
 Jean de Lusignan (d. after 1580), as Hilarion he was a Monk at Antiphonitis
 Jacques de Lusignan (d. Paris, ca 1590), Bishop of Limassol
 Jean Philippe de Lusignan (d. ca 1571)
 Hercule de Lusignan, in 1580 was living under the Turks
 Helene de Lusignan, died young
 Isabelle de Lusignan, married ... Nikephoros
 Marguerite de Lusignan, died young
 Helene de Lusignan, married Demetrios Palaiologos, Lord of Eglia, Captain of Nicosia
 Lusignane de Lusignan, married Domenico di San Andrea
 Hector de Lusignan, married firstly Marguerite d'Acre (d. after 1540), married secondly after 1540 Margarita Zorzalemi, and had:
 Philippe de Lusignan (d. Rome, ca 1573), a Canon in Nicosia
 Louis de Lusignan (d. after 1580), a Soldier
 Jerome de Lusignan, a Canon
 Marguerite de Lusignan, married Giovanni Crispo (son of Giacomo IV Crispo)
 Jean-Perez de Lusignan (d. 1571/1573)
 Hercule de Lusignan (d. after 1573)
 Ambroise de Lusignan (killed in action in Cyprus, 1570/1571)
 Lucrece de Lusignan (d. Nicosia, 1566/1569)
 Laure de Lusignan, married ... Bustron
 Marie de Lusignan, married Pierre Provost
 Pierre de Lusignan, married ... Bustron, the parents of:
 Gaspard de Lusignan (d. ca 1573), married ... Muscorno, the parents of:
 Pietro de Lusignan (d. Rome, 1611), married in Constantinople before 1590 Luchina ... (d. Rome, 1624), the parents of:
 Gasparo de Lusignan (Constantinople, 1590/1591 – Loreto, 1660)
 Lusignana de Lusignan (d. 1627), married in Rome, 1611 Stefano Joli, a Goldsmith (d. 1627)
 Ortensia de Lusignan (1606–1625), married in Rome, 1624 Giovanni Baptista Seraglio
 Orsola de Lusignan (1609–1609)
 Hercule de Lusignan (d. after 1573)
 a daughter de Lusignan, married before 1570 ... Placca
 Alvis=Louis de Lusignan, married ... de Rames
 Philippe de Lusignan (d. after 1573), married ... di Milidoni
 Jean-Perez de Lusignan (d. 1570), an Augustine Priest
 Pierre de Lusignan (d. Constantinople, after 1571), married ... Muscorno
 Marguerite de Lusignan
 Jean de Lusignan (d. at the Court of Savoy)
 Pons de Lusignan, married ca 1500 Medea Podcataro, the parents of:
 Harion de Lusignan, died young
 Orsola de Lusignan, married Louis d'Acre
 Melesinde de Lusignan
 Helvis de Lusignan, married Hector de Chevides (d. 1461)
 Mariette de Lusignan (d. after 1474), married Onofrio di Requesens (d. ca 1474), Seneschal of Cyprus

Christians of the Crusades
Princes of Galilee
Military personnel killed in action
1427 deaths
Year of birth unknown
House of Poitiers-Lusignan